Ahmad bin Mohamed Magad (born 22 December 1952) is a Singaporean former politician. A member of the governing People's Action Party (PAP), he was the Member of Parliament (MP) representing the Pasir Ris–Loyang division of Pasir Ris GRC between 1997 and 2001 and the Pasir Ris East division of Pasir Ris–Punggol GRC between 2001 and 2011.

Early life and education 
Ahmad was one of six children of Arab Singaporean Mohamed Omar Magad. Ahmad completed his primary education at Haig Boys' School and his secondary education at Presbyterian High School. He won a Public Service Commission scholarship and pursued an engineering degree at Fachhochschule Aalen in Germany, graduating in 1974. He completed an MBA from Brunel University in 1990.

Career 
Following his graduation from university, Ahmad worked as a Training Officer for the Economic Development Board from 1974 to 1979. He subsequently became an engineering manager with FJW Industries. In 1989, Ahmad became the Managing Director of II-VI Singapore Pte Ltd, a subsidiary of a United States company that produces optoelectronic components. He continues to hold this position till today. 

Ahmad was one of the co-founders of the organisation Association of Muslim Professionals, which was intended to be an independent non-partisan alternative to MENDAKI. He was also appointed as a Justice of the Peace.

Political career 
Ahmad ran for election as a PAP candidate in the 1997 General Election in Pasir Ris GRC. His PAP team comprised Charles Chong, Ong Kian Min, and Teo Chee Hean. The team won 70.86% of the votes against the Workers' Party. 

In the 2001 General Election, the boundaries were redrawn and Ahmad joined the PAP team for Pasir Ris-Punggol GRC. The constituency was uncontested and the PAP team was elected to parliament.

In the 2006 General Election, Ahmad remained in the PAP team for Pasir Ris-Punggol GRC. The PAP team defeated the SDA team by winning 68.70% of the votes.

Ahmad stepped down from politics at the 2011 election.

References 

Living people
1952 births
People's Action Party politicians
Members of the Parliament of Singapore
Singaporean Muslims
Singaporean people of Arab descent